Herold Dominic "Muddy" Ruel (February 20, 1896 – November 13, 1963) was an American professional baseball player, coach, manager and general manager. He played as a catcher in Major League Baseball from 1915 to 1934.  One of the top defensive catchers of his era, Ruel was notable for being the personal catcher for Baseball Hall of Fame pitcher, Walter Johnson and for scoring the winning run for the Washington Senators in Game 7 of the 1924 World Series. He also played for the St. Louis Browns, New York Yankees, Boston Red Sox, Detroit Tigers, and the Chicago White Sox during a career that lasted 19 seasons. After his playing career, Ruel served as a coach and a baseball executive.

Major League career
Born in St. Louis, Missouri, Ruel began his professional baseball career at the age of 19 with his hometown team, the St. Louis Browns, appearing in 10 games during the 1915 season. With the Yankees, Ruel shared catching duties with Truck Hannah from 1918 to 1920. He was the Yankees catcher on August 16,  when a Carl Mays' pitch hit Ray Chapman on the head, resulting in Chapman's death the next day. He later defended Mays and said that he was innocent of any wrongdoing.

In the 1923 season, he posted a career-high batting average of .316 along with 54 runs batted in. He led American League catchers in assists and putouts, and finished 11th in the American League Most Valuable Player Award ballot. He had another solid year in 1924, playing in 149 games and once again leading the American League catchers in assists and putouts. With Ruel calling the pitches, Walter Johnson's career was revitalized, as he led the league with 23 victories and a 2.72 earned run average. The Senators clinched the  American League pennant, finishing the season two games ahead of the New York Yankees.

The Senators would face John McGraw's heavily favored New York Giants in the 1924 World Series. The two teams traded wins back and forth until the series reached the seventh and deciding game. The Senators trailed the Giants 3–1 in the eighth inning of Game 7, when they rallied and tied the score. Ruel hit a single, then scored the tying run during the rally, to send the game into extra innings with the score tied at three runs apeice. In the bottom of the twelfth inning with Ruel at bat, he hit a high, foul ball directly over home plate. The Giants' catcher, Hank Gowdy, dropped his protective mask to field the ball but, failing to toss the mask aside, stumbled over it and dropped the ball, thus giving Ruel another chance to bat. On the next pitch, Ruel hit a double and, then proceeded to score the winning run when Earl McNeely hit a ground ball that took a bad hop over third baseman Freddie Lindstrom's head.

Ruel had another good season in 1925, producing a .310 batting average along with 54 runs batted in and, for the third consecutive year, he led American League catchers in assists and putouts. The Senators would win the American League pennant for the second year in a row, however they were defeated by the Pittsburgh Pirates in the 1925 World Series. Ruel hit for a .299 batting average in 1926 and led the American League catchers with a .989 fielding percentage, as the Senators slipped to a fourth-place finish. He had one more good season in 1927, posting a .310 batting average and finishing second among catchers in fielding percentage, putouts, assists and baserunners caught stealing. Ruel finished sixth in the  American League Most Valuable Player Award balloting.

 
After the 1927 season, his offensive production began to diminish, and by 1929, Bennie Tate had begun to take over as the Senators' main catcher. In December 1930, Ruel's contract was purchased from the Senators by the Boston Red Sox, who then traded him to the Detroit Tigers in August 1931. With the Tigers, he served as a reserve catcher in 1932 working behind Ray Hayworth. He returned to the St. Louis Browns in 1933 before ending his playing career with the Chicago White Sox in 1934 at the age of 38.

Career statistics
In a nineteen-year major league career, Ruel played in 1,468 games, accumulating 1,242 hits in 4,514 at bats for a .275 career batting average along with 4 home runs, 534 runs batted in and a .365 on-base percentage. He possessed strong defensive skills, leading American League catchers in fielding percentage three consecutive years (1926–28), finishing with a .982 career fielding percentage. Ruel also led American League catchers three times in putouts and assists and twice in range factor and in baserunners caught stealing. He made 23 double plays in 1924, the seventh highest season total for catchers in major league history. 

His reputation as a defensive stand out is enhanced because of the era in which he played. In the Deadball Era, catchers played a huge defensive role, given the large number of bunts and stolen base attempts, as well as the difficulty of handling the spitball pitchers who dominated pitching staffs. Richard Kendall of the Society for American Baseball Research devised an unscientific study that ranked Ruel as the fifth most dominating fielding catcher in major league history.

Post-playing career
After retiring as a player, Ruel spent a decade as a coach with the Chicago White Sox from 1935 to 1945. He worked with Chandler for only one year before accepting his only managerial job with the St. Louis Browns, where he led the 1947 team to a dismal 59–95 record, good for the American League cellar. Ruel then coached for the Cleveland Indians from 1948 to 1950, winning another world championship as a coach with the Indians in the 1948 World Series. He was later named as the director of the Detroit Tigers' farm system before taking on the role as the Tigers' general manager from 1954 to 1956.

Ruel was one of the few major leaguers to hold a law degree. He earned his degree from Washington University in St. Louis and was admitted to practice before the U.S. Supreme Court. Ruel is credited for being the first to label the catcher's protective equipment as the "tools of ignorance". This was a self deprecating reference to the harsh, physical demands of the catcher's position due to the exposure to the errant balls, foul tips and collisions at home plate. He is buried at Alta Mesa Memorial Park in Palo Alto, California.

Managerial record

References

External links

 Muddy Ruel New York Times Obituary at www.thedeadballera.com
 Tigers Under New Farm Ruel, by Frank Lewis, Baseball Digest, January 1952
 Muddy – But Stylish, by Francis Stann, Baseball Digest, February 1964
 How Senators' Strategy Won for Johnson, by Muddy Ruel, Baseball Digest, October 1964
 

1896 births
1963 deaths
20th-century American lawyers
American people of French descent
Baseball players from St. Louis
Boston Red Sox players
Chicago White Sox coaches
Chicago White Sox players
Cleveland Indians coaches
Detroit Tigers executives
Detroit Tigers players
Major League Baseball catchers
Major League Baseball executives
Major League Baseball farm directors
Major League Baseball general managers
Major League Baseball pitching coaches
Memphis Chickasaws players
New York Yankees players
St. Louis Browns managers
St. Louis Browns players
Washington Senators (1901–1960) players
Washington University School of Law alumni
Washington University in St. Louis alumni